Sanford Brown may refer to:

 Sanford Brown (writer) (born 1957), American travel writer and United Methodist minister
 Sanford Brown (politician) (1909-1986), American politician
 Sanford–Brown, education organization